Srboljub Markušević ((5 May 1936 – 18 November 2019) was a Yugoslav and later Serbian professional footballer and football manager.

Playing career
Markušević spent his whole playing career at Bosnian club Sarajevo, making 148 league appearances for the club and scoring 22 goals. Along with 132 friendly games he played for Sarajevo, Markušević played 280 games for the team in total

Managerial career
After ending his career, Markušević became a football manager, starting out as a coach in the youth team of Sarajevo in 1966.

He then became a manager and led the first team of Sarajevo on four separate occasions (1969–1971, 1972–1973, 1981–1983 and 1990). His biggest managerial achievement with Sarajevo and in his whole career was leading the team to the round of 16 in the 1982–83 UEFA Cup season. Markušević also led Sarajevo to being Yugoslav Cup runners-up in the 1982–83 season.

In between his third and fourth appointment at Sarajevo, He managed Budućnost Podgorica from 1985 to 1986.

Death
Markušević died on 19 November 2019 in Belgrade, Serbia at the age of 83.

Honours

Player
Sarajevo
Yugoslav Second League: 1957–58 (zone II A)
Yugoslav First League runner up: 1964–65

Manager
Sarajevo
Yugoslav Cup runner up: 1982–83

References

External links

1936 births
2019 deaths
People from Prizren
Association football wingers
Yugoslav footballers
Serbian footballers
Yugoslav First League players
FK Sarajevo players
Yugoslav football managers
Serbian football managers
Yugoslav First League managers
FK Sarajevo managers
FK Budućnost Podgorica managers
FK Sutjeska Nikšić managers